Christ the King Sixth Forms  are sixth form colleges based over three sites in South London, England. The college was first founded in 1992 by the Catholic Church on a site in Lewisham owned by the Archdiocese of Southwark, it welcomes students from all religions and backgrounds. The college is a free-standing institution responsible for its own affairs. The original site in Lewisham is called Christ the King: Emmanuel.

The college is run by its Principal and senior staff, whose appointment is one of the tasks of the governing body. The Church provides guidelines to ensure that the institution retains its Catholic ethos. The college is also accountable to its public funder, the Education Funding Agency.

History
In 2004, the College was awarded Beacon status. The college was the first of its kind to be judged outstanding under the new Ofsted inspection régime.

In 2008 St. Luke's College, (formerly St. Mary and St. Joseph's RC School) in Sidcup became part of Christ the King Sixth Form College, being re-opened at Christ the King: St Mary's. This had previously been the site of St Mary & St Joseph's Catholic School, a Roman Catholic secondary school.

On 1 February 2013 Crossways Sixth Form in Telegraph Hill was closed and the site taken over under the name Christ the King: Aquinas.

Curriculum
The sixth forms provide instruction in: AS/A Level subjects; the Level 1 Introductory course; Level 2 and Level 3 vocational courses;and also BTEC courses ; and in three re-sit  GCSE subjects: mathematics, English language and science. Students also receive tutorials and general lessons in religious education. Mass is observed once a week in chapel. The college has two full-time lay chaplains and one part-time priest chaplain.

In 2019, Christ the King Sixth Forms announced that they would be remodelling the curriculum offer for 2020;

CTK Aquinas will become a selective A Level centre, where students can choose from over 21 A Levels (Entry criteria will be selective with an average grade 6)

CTK Emmanuel will become a professional centre for excellence, where students will be offered high quality vocational courses, with the emphasis on University progression.

CTK St Mary’s will continue to offer a wide range of both BTEC and A Level courses at a sixth from centre for excellence

The following "partner" schools get priority when it comes to admissions:
 Bonus Pastor Catholic College
 Trinity Church of England School  
 St Matthew Academy  
 St Michael's Catholic College
 St Paul's Academy
 St Thomas More Catholic School
 St Ursula's Convent School
 Conisborough College

Awards
In 2013 a team from the college won the national Animation13 competition run by Manchester University.

External links
 College website

References

Education in the London Borough of Lewisham
Catholic Church in London
E
Sixth form colleges in London
Learning and Skills Beacons
Catholic secondary schools in the Archdiocese of Southwark
Education in the London Borough of Bexley
Educational institutions established in 1992
1992 establishments in England
Buildings and structures in Sidcup